In 1982, the first Division I NCAA women's basketball tournament was held. The NCAA was able to offer incentives, such as payment of transportation costs, to participating members, something the Association for Intercollegiate Athletics for Women was not able to do.  When former AIAW powerhouses like Tennessee, Louisiana Tech, and Old Dominion decided to participate in the NCAA tournament, the AIAW tournament lost much of its appeal and popularity.

NBC canceled its TV contract with the association, and in mid-1982 the AIAW stopped operations in all sports. Following the last AIAW sanctioned event in 1982, the AIAW pursued a federal antitrust suit against the NCAA. But one year later, after the presiding judge ruled against the organization, the AIAW ceased existence on June 30, 1983.

Under NCAA governance, scholarships increased. However, several problems the NCAA was facing, then and now, began to also affect women's intercollegiate athletics. Examples of these include recruiting irregularities and increased turnover in coaching positions for revenue-producing sports.

Several AIAW championships were televised by the TVS Television Network in 1979.

Television

Notes
There was no TV coverage of the national semifinals prior to 1985.
All 63 games were broadcast on television from 2003 to 2019 on ESPN and ESPN2 with added coverage on ESPNU and ESPN3 since 2006. Local teams are shown on each channel when available, with "whip-around" coverage during the first and second rounds designed to showcase the most competitive contests in the rest of the country. All regional semifinals, regional finals and Final Four games were televised nationally in exclusive windows.
In 2021 ESPN3 coverage was dropped (except for streaming of ABC games). Instead all 63 games were shown nationally in exclusive windows on ESPN, ESPN2, ESPNU, ESPNews, and ABC. 
Beginning in 2022 the tournament expanded to 67 games with all being shown nationally in exclusive windows on ESPN, ESPN2, ESPNU, ESPNews, and ABC.

Radio

External links
Women's National Championship numbers game.

Women's Final Four broadcasters
Women's Final Four broadcasters
CBS Radio Sports
Women's Final Four broadcasters
Women's NCAA Final Four broadcasters
Broadcasters
NCAA Women's Final Four broadcasters